Lavangen Church is a parish church of the Church of Norway in Lavangen Municipality in Troms og Finnmark county, Norway. It is located in the village of Å, in an area called Soløy, just north of Hesjevika. It is the church for the Lavangen parish which is part of the Senja prosti (deanery) in the Diocese of Nord-Hålogaland. The white, wooden church was built in a long church style in 1891 using plans drawn up by the architect Jacob Wilhelm Nordan. The church seats about 420 people.

Media gallery

See also
List of churches in Nord-Hålogaland

References

Lavangen
Churches in Troms
Wooden churches in Norway
19th-century Church of Norway church buildings
Churches completed in 1891
1891 establishments in Norway
Long churches in Norway